This is Your Right was an advice programme made by Granada Television and presented by Michael Winstanley.

It inspired the creation of a Hindi and Urdu language version Aap Kaa Hak (/This is Your Right), also by Granada, aimed at South Asian migrants in the United Kingdom and presented by Indian-born doctor Shiv Pande and Pakistan-born barrister Mukhtar Hussain.

References

External links
http://www.granadaland.org/jon-savage-recalls-working-on-the-consumer-programme-this-is-your-right/

Television shows produced by Granada Television